Sriranga Gadyam is a Sanskrit prayer written by the Hindu philosopher Ramanuja towards the end of the 11th century. It is one of the first bhakti prayers in the Sri Vaishnava school of thought and is the basis for many prayers, like the Raghuveera gadyam, also of this style. It is recited in the 108 Divya Desam temples, including Srirangam.

Composition
Ramanuja and his disciples visited the Ranganathaswamy Temple in Srirangam on Panguni Uttiram, a day in the Tamil calendar month of Panguni (in spring) on the day of the ascension of the star called Uttiram.  In Tamil mythology, Uttiram was in ascent when the goddess of the temple, Sri Ranganayaki Tayar, Lakshmi, was born. Ramanuja was inspired by the festivities of the day and composed the Sriranga Gadyam, the Saranagati Gadyam, and the Vaikuntha Gadyam.

Content

Sriranga Gadyam, unlike the commentaries of Ramanuja on Vedanta, does not have detailed philosophical debates. Instead it is a pure expression of bhakti and gives a detailed description of the God, Ranganatha as the repository of countless guna, that he calls kalyana guna meaning "virtuous".

First he describes Ranganatha as jnana (true and perfect knowledge), Bhala or power, in this case ability to support the whole Universe, Aishwarya (incomparable wealth and ruler ship of the Universe), veerya (untiring virility), shakthi (power to act without extraneous help), agni (unmatched radiance), Souseelya (purest character), Vaatsalya (pure unmitigated love), Maardava (affectionate tenderness towards devotees), Aarjava (honesty), Souhardha (thinking of good only), Samya( equanimous one), Karunya (Merciful), Madhurya (sweet even to enemies), Gambheerya (majesty and nobility), Audharya (giving out liberally), Chathurya (intelligence, ability to change even enemies into friends), Sthairya (determined to stay on chosen course), Dhairya (undaunted courage to bring succour to the bhakthas), Sowrya (ability to fight alone), Parakrama (winning the battles effortlessly), Sathya Kaama (having Thy will ever fulfilled), Sathya Sankalpa (having Thy deeds fully executed), Krutithvam (carrying out the duties of God), Kruthangnathai (remembering with gratitude even a little worship offered to Him) and repository and ocean of all such innumerable virtues; He is parabrahman and Purushotthaman (foremost of men).

Next, he explains how he is trapped in Samsara and bound by his karma into doing actions that result in sins. Neither gyan yoga, the yoga of knowledge nor Karma Yoga, the part of virtuous deeds as described in Bhagvad Gita help him get Moksha.

Finally, he asks that unworthy as he is in so many ways, he be granted the grace of Ranganatha.

Style
The prose of this hymn comprises alternate long and short sentences with many adjectival phrases.

References

Sri Vaishnavism
Hindu mantras
Mantras